Democratic Independent Party was a centrist political party in North and South Korea. The party was established on 19 October 1947. Its initiators were An Jae-hong, Hong Myong-hui, Kim Ho, Pak Yong-hee,  and Kim Won-yong. Of them, Hong became the chairman of the party. It participated in elections in North Korea from 1948 until at least 1962.

Electoral history

Supreme People's Assembly elections

See also
 Politics of North Korea
 List of political parties in North Korea
 Elections in North Korea
 Politics of South Korea
 List of political parties in South Korea
 Elections in South Korea

References

Works cited
 

1947 establishments in Korea
Political parties established in 1947
Centrist parties in Asia
Political parties in North Korea